Peter Jaks (4 May 1966 – 5 October 2011) was a Swiss ice hockey player. He competed at the 1988 and 1992 Winter Olympics. He committed suicide on 5 October 2011 by standing in front of a train in Bari, Italy.

Career statistics

Regular season and playoffs

International

References

External links

1966 births
2011 suicides
Czechoslovak emigrants to Switzerland
Ice hockey players at the 1988 Winter Olympics
Ice hockey players at the 1992 Winter Olympics
Olympic ice hockey players of Switzerland
People from Frýdek-Místek
Suicides by train
Suicides in Italy
Swiss ice hockey right wingers